Anoushirvan Arjmand (‎; 19 October 1941 – 14 December 2014) was an Iranian actor, best known for his roles in films such as Duel (2004), Tardid (2009), and He Who Said No (2014). He also appeared in the television series Mokhtarnameh, The Gun Loaded and Shaheed-e-Kufa. He was born in Zahedan, Sistan and Baluchestan Province although his family were originally from Mashhad.

Arjmand died from a heart attack on 14 December 2014 in Tehran, aged 73. He was buried on 16 December at Behesht-e Zahra.

References

External links
 

1941 births
2014 deaths
People from Zahedan
People from Mashhad
Iranian male film actors
Iranian male stage actors
Iranian male television actors
Recipients of the Order of Culture and Art
Burials at artist's block of Behesht-e Zahra